The NCAA Division I Field Hockey Championship is an American intercollegiate field hockey tournament conducted by the National Collegiate Athletic Association (NCAA), and determines the Division I national champion. The championship is contested exclusively by women's teams and there is no equivalent NCAA men's championship. The tournament has been held annually since 1981. The most successful team is the North Carolina Tar Heels, who have ten titles. In addition, North Carolina has finished national runner-up an NCAA record eleven times.  The most recent championship was won by the North Carolina Tar Heels. Division II and Division III championships are also held each year.

History 
Field hockey was one of 12 women's sports added to the NCAA championship program for the 1981–82 school year, as the NCAA engaged in battle with the AIAW for sole governance of women's collegiate sports. The AIAW continued to conduct its established championship program in the same 12 (and other) sports; however, after a year of dual women's championships, the NCAA overcame the AIAW and usurped its authority and membership. The first NCAA women's national championship events were staged November 21–22, 1981, in cross country and field hockey.

The tournament originally began with six teams but has since expanded to 19; at different times a third-place game has been played as well. Under the tournament's current format, 19 teams qualify for the tournament with three play-in games. The play-in games and first two rounds are played at the home turf of the higher seeds in each matchup. The final four teams then move on to the championship rounds at a predetermined site.

Past champions

Tournament Records and Statistics

Team titles

Statistics 
Most Goals, Game: 10
Old Dominion (1984; Old Dominion–10 vs. Virginia–0)
Most Goals, Both Teams: 13
Maryland (2008; Maryland–8 vs. Duke–5)
Goals Per Game, Tournament: 5.67
Old Dominion (1984)
Fewest Goals Allowed Per Game, Tournament: 0.00
Old Dominion (1990, three games)
Old Dominion (1992, three games)
Wake Forest (2002, four games)
Penalty Corners, Game: 31
Old Dominion (1984; vs. Virginia)

Individual records

Most Goals, Single Game: 5
Paula Infante, Maryland (2004; Maryland–5 vs. Delaware–2)
Maartje van Rijswijk, Old Dominion (2012; Old Dominion–6 vs. Michigan–1)
Most Goals, Tournament: 11
Marina DiGiacomo, Old Dominion (2000; four games)
Most Assists, Game: 6
Cheryl Van Kuren, Old Dominion (1984; Old Dominion–10 vs. Virginia–0)
Most Assists, Tournament: 8
Adrienne Yoder, Old Dominion (2000; four games)
Saves, Game: 36
Missy Farwell, Virginia (1984; Virginia–2 vs. North Carolina–1)
Fewest Goals Allowed Per Game, Tournament: 0.00
Kathy Fosina, Old Dominion (1990; three games)
Kim Decker, Old Dominion (1992; three games)
Katie Ridd, Wake Forest (2002; four games)

Result by school and by year 

58 teams have appeared in the NCAA Tournament in at least one year starting with 1981 (the initial year that the post-season tournament was under the auspices of the NCAA). The results for all years are shown in this table below.

The code in each cell represents the furthest the team made it in the respective tournament:
  National Champion
  National Runner-up
  Semifinals
  Quarterfinals (Two teams in 1981, four teams thereafter)
 ,  Round of 16 (Only 12 teams, 1982-1998)
  Play-In Round (Starting 2013)

All-time record
Source:

as of end of 2022 championship
 indicates schools belong to Division II.
 indicates schools that no longer sponsor field hockey.
School indicates they have win at least one championship.
Other bold indicates most in respective column.

See also
NCAA Division II Field Hockey Championship
NCAA Division III Field Hockey Championship
AIAW Intercollegiate Women's Field Hockey Champions
USA Field Hockey Hall of Fame

References

External links
NCAA field hockey link
 

 
Women's field hockey competitions in the United States
1981 establishments in the United States
Recurring sporting events established in 1981